Ramón Zavaleta (born 22 September 1959) is a Peruvian former cyclist. He competed in the individual road race event at the 1984 Summer Olympics.

References

External links
 

1959 births
Living people
Peruvian male cyclists
Olympic cyclists of Peru
Cyclists at the 1984 Summer Olympics
Place of birth missing (living people)
20th-century Peruvian people